Jérémy Stinat (born 15 December 1978 in Chartres) is a French professional footballer who played for several years in Ligue 2.

References

1978 births
Living people
French footballers
Ligue 2 players
ASOA Valence players
Grenoble Foot 38 players
CS Sedan Ardennes players
Stade Lavallois players
Thouars Foot 79 players

Association football defenders